Asōfuji Seiya (born January 17, 1976, as Kiyotoshi Suginomori) is a retired sumo wrestler from Fukaura, Nishitsugaru, Aomori, Japan. His highest rank was maegashira 13. He is the elder brother of Aminishiki.

Career
Asōfuji made his professional debut in January 1994. He joined Ajigawa stable, run by former yokozuna Asahifuji, who was also of Nishitsugaru District and a cousin of Asōfuji's father. He took a long time to climb up the rankings, mainly due to his relatively light weight (barely 100 kg). He was outperformed by his younger brother Aminishiki, who, though he joined the stable three years after Asōfuji, had already reached sekitori status by 2000. Asōfuji first reached the second highest jūryō division in September 2003,  but lasted only one tournament before being demoted back to the third makushita division. He reappeared in the second division a year later and in November 2006 he finally made his top makuuchi division debut at the age of 30. He was the ninth oldest makuuchi debutant since the end of World War II. In that tournament, there were three sets of brothers (Asofuji and Aminishiki, Kitazakura and Toyozakura, and Rohō and Hakurozan) in the top division simultaneously for the first and only time in sumo history. Asōfuji could manage only a 6-9 score in his top division debut, and only four wins in the next tournament in January 2007.

He fell back to the jūryō division for the  March 2007 tournament and a 4-11 record in July sent him right to the bottom of the division. He held onto sekitori status with an 8-7 mark in September but could manage only five wins in January 2008 and fell back to makushita. He managed a 5-2 score in the March 2008 tournament which returned him immediately to the second division, but again he was unable to secure kachi-koshi (more wins than losses) and was demoted to makushita once more. He scored 5-2 again in July for another immediate return to jūryō for the September tournament, but fell back to the third division yet again, narrowly missing the kachi-koshi with a 7-8 score. However, a fine 6-1 score at the top makushita ranking in November 2008 ensured his return to the sekitori ranks once again. This was his sixth promotion to jūryō, putting him in equal third place on the all-time list. He remained in the jūryō division for the rest of his career, although he never won more than nine bouts in a tournament.

Retirement from sumo

Asōfuji was one of 23 wrestlers found guilty of fixing the result of bouts after an investigation by the Japan Sumo Association, and ordered to retire in April 2011. He considered filing a lawsuit against his dismissal, but chose to hand in his retirement papers on April 4. His danpatsu-shiki or official retirement ceremony was held at the Ryōgoku Kokugikan on May 29, 2011. After reportedly considering a career in mixed martial arts, he was hired privately by Isegahama stable as a trainer.
 
In May 2022 the former Asofuji attended his brother's retirement ceremony, exactly eleven years after his own. As of 2022 he was working as a manager for an industrial waste disposal company.

Fighting style
Asōfuji had a weight disadvantage against most of his competitors in the sekitori ranks, and had to rely on his technical skill. Among his favourite techniques were nage, or throws. His most common winning move over the six tournaments from July 2007 to May 2008 was uwatedashinage, or "pulling outer-arm throw", but he was also adept at shitatenage, or inner-arm throws.

Family
Asōfuji was married in December 2006.

Career record

See also
Glossary of sumo terms
List of past sumo wrestlers

References

External links
 

1976 births
Living people
Japanese sumo wrestlers
Sumo people from Aomori Prefecture
Sportspeople banned for life